Grace Houpapa-Barrett (born 25 July 1995) is a New Zealand rugby union player. She plays for the Black Ferns internationally and for Chiefs Manawa in the Super Rugby Aupiki competition. She also represents Waikato provincially in the Farah Palmer Cup.

Rugby career

2014 & 2020 
Houpapa-Barrett made her provincial debut for Waikato in 2014. She played for the New Zealand Barbarians and the Possibles in 2020.

2021–2022 
Houpapa-Barrett played in the inaugural women's Super Rugby match for the Chiefs in 2021.

Houpapa-Barrett was named in the Black Ferns squad for their end of year tour of France and England in 2021. She made her international debut for New Zealand on 31 October against England at Exeter. She later started in the second test against England. She only played in the first of two Tests against France in Pau.

Chiefs Manawa signed Houpapa-Barrett for their inaugural season of Super Rugby Aupiki.

References

External links 

 Black Ferns Profile

1995 births
Living people
New Zealand women's international rugby union players
New Zealand female rugby union players